Jörg Jung (born 22 November 1965, in Mönchengladbach) is a German former professional football player and manager. He was most recently the manager of KFC Uerdingen 05.

He most notably played at Borussia Mönchengladbach and SC Freiburg.

He has managed SuS 09 Dinslaken, Schwarz-Weiß Essen, GFC 09 Düren, SV Straelen, Sportfreunde Siegen, and KFC Uerdingen 05.

References

External links 
 

1965 births
Living people
Sportspeople from Mönchengladbach
German footballers
Association football defenders
Bundesliga players
2. Bundesliga players
Borussia Mönchengladbach players
Borussia Mönchengladbach II players
SC Freiburg players
Alemannia Aachen players
SC Jülich players
German football managers
KFC Uerdingen 05 managers
Sportfreunde Siegen managers
Footballers from North Rhine-Westphalia